The Roman Catholic parish of St. Sylvanus lies within the Accra suburb of Pokuase in Ghana. It centres on the church of St. Sylvanus, which opened in 1948. St Sylvanus was established as a parish in 2014, after being a rectorate since 2006.

History 
The church of St. Sylvanus, Pokuase, was established in 1948 by Mr. Cosmos Sena who was a Togolese. It was established near the Pokuase Agricultural Workers Quarters. Since he could not speak the English language, he was assisted by the catechist, Mr. William Amuzu Akado. Mr. William Amuzu Akado who became the first Catechist had to do most of the work. Priests travelled from Accra to celebrate mass. Some of these were Bishop Adolph Noser, Fr. Alphonse Merten, Fr. Gerald Fini, an African and a few others. A piece of land was acquired from the Dodoo family for the erection of a permanent church building as the parishioners worshipped in school classrooms. The Church became an outstation of St. Kizito Catholic Church in 1985 and was administered from there. The late Archbishop Dominic Kodzo Andoh cut the sod for the building of a chapel in 1998.

The church was elevated to a rectorate in 2006 and the first Parochial Administrator is Rev Fr. George Ekow Mensah with  Rev Fr. Albert Gyapaning as his vicar. There are six outstations located at Amasaman, Sarpeiman, Medie, Adjen Kotoku, Ashalaja and Mayera. The Chapel has been completed and dedicated in 2014 by Most Rev Bishop Charles Palmer Buckle, Metropolitan Bishop of Accra.

The church has grown in numbers and two masses are held on Sundays from 7am-9am and from 9.30-11am. There are many societies within the church which also has a marriage school.

In the early 1950s,  Fr. Joseph H. Lauck worked at Pokuase while residing at St. Joseph Catholic Church situated at the Catholic Press Offices near the Roxy Cinema at Adabraka in Accra.  It was this church that became the Holy Spirit Cathedral in Accra. St. Sylvanus Church grew under S.V.D. priests such as Fr. Oto Hening, Fr. Martin Wells. 
Since the Church cannot grow without a school Mr. William Amuzu Akado and Mr. Cosmos Sena contacted the Dodoo family in Accra and acquired the  present site for a church and school. Mr. Aryee gave his school  to the catholic church and the school was moved to this  site with William Amuzu Akado as the first Head teacher. The first classroom was constructed by Rev. Bro Damien SVD who was then residing in Accra.

In the 1980s the  Gas protested that the Church was too far from Pokuase town so two different plots were acquired  in the Pokuase township.  This defeated the intention of the pioneers who wanted the church to serve the Amasaman, Fise, Agric. Quarters, Afiaman, Shikpontele and others. In view of the protest, the church was moved to Pokuase and worshiped in the District Assembly School during the time of Fr. Anthony Baiden Amissah.

1n 1982, the Holy Spirit Cathedral at Adabraka has oversight responsibility over St. Sylvanus and Rev Fr.Bobby Benson was placed in charge.

Outstation of St Kizito Church at Nima 
In 1985, Rev Fr. Alex Bobby Benson  was made the Parish Priest of  St. Kizito Catholic Church at Nima a suburb of Accra. The St. Sylvanus Catholic Church Pokuase became an outstation of St. Kizito Church.  Fr. Benson suggested that the church should move back to the present site but the indigenous Gas were reluctant. That very week, there was a great storm and the roof of the Local Council School was blown off.  Fr. Bobby Benson saw this as a divine intervention and the church moved back to the present site.

The St. Sylvanus church which was almost dormant was rejuvenated by Rev. Fr. Bobby Benson. He was assisted by the late Rev. Fr. Albert Kretchmer (SVD) then resident at Nima and worked at the National Catholic Secretariat. Fr. Benson evangelized in Kwashiekuma ma, Nsakina and others. It was during Fr. Benson's time that the firsts Corpu Christi celebrated at Kwashiekuma ma.  The Metropolitan Archbishop of Accra Most Rev. Gabriel Charles Palmer-Buckle who was the chaplain for Achimota College joined the celebration of Corpus Christi at Kwashiekuma ma. Rev Fr. Benson introduced income generation ventures including crop farming and piggery.

In 1992, Rev. Fr. Miguel Oppong took over from Fr Bobby Benson as Parish Priest of St. Kizito. He started the foundation of the present church building in 1998.  The sod was cut by the late Archbishop Emeritus Most Rev. Dominic Andoh. The Parish Pastoral Council (PPC)  Chairman was Mr. George Amoah and Mr. Jarvis Nuworsah the chairman of the Planning Committee.
The late Fr. Lawrence Duho, an assistant to Fr. Oppong also helped immensely to build on what their predecessor had done.

In March 1999, the late Fr. Patrick Charkitey was made the Parish Priest to succeed Fr. Miguel Oppong.  During his time his assistant was Fr. Matthias Kotoka Amuzu. After Fr. Charkiteys death Fr. Amuzu worked with the Pokuase Church for a short period. When Fr. Amuzu was left alone at Nima, Rev. Father Benjamin Poku Donkor then working at the National Catholic Secretariat celebrate mass at St Sylvanus Pokuase.

Fr. Mintah took over from Fr. Charkitey and it was during his time that renovation work was started on the old school building but he could not complete it before he was transferred. Fr. Edmund Ekow Neizer took over from Fr. Mintah and completed renovations work on the school building, worked on the church building and roofed it. He converted the piggery into a classroom block.

St. Sylvanus Rectorate 

On 11 June 2006, the St. Sylvanus was elevated to a rectorate and the first Parochial Administrator Fr. George Ekow Mensah and his Vicar Fr. Albert Gyapaning celebrated mass in the church. Fr. Albert Gyapaning had a short stay and was transferred to St. Theresa's Catholic Church, Kaneshie.  Fr. Peter Hesse was the next vicar to work in the parish and later came Fr. Nicholas Dzikunu. Joseph Arthur Akado was son of the first catechist who has been a catechist of the church since the late 1970s to date and was made Extra Ordinary Minister of the Holy Eucharist.

In 2008, the church celebrated its 60th Anniversary under the theme 'Ebenezer thus far the Lord has brought us' St. Sylvanus Church has about 1000 parishioners and a choir. From February 2010 the church holds two Sunday masses.

St. Sylvanus Parish 

The church was elevated to a parish on Sunday 7 September 2014. The Metropolitan Archbishop of Accra, Most Rev. Fr. Gabriel Charles Palmer Buckle installed Rev Fr. George Ekow Mensah as first parish priest of the church. There was a dedication of the church on Saturday 6 September 2014.

Parish Pastoral Councils 
A Parish Pastoral Council was put in place to help administer the goods of the church. The chairpersons of the Parish Pastoral Councils (PPC) were Mr. Robert Mensah and Mr. Francis Quartey (deceased), Mr. Sylvester Korang Amoako, Mr. George Aryee Armah,  Mrs. Eunice Adams, Mr. George Amoah (1997-1999), Mrs. Felicia Oppong Nkrumah (1999-2002), Ms. Alice Saanuo (2002-2006) and Mr. Albert Fynn(2007-2011).

The present Parish Pastoral Council(2011- now) members include: 

 Mr. Lloyd Fiifi Sackey -Chairman
 Mrs. Aba Dadzie        -Vice Chairperson
 Mr. Andrew Baafi       -Secretary 
 Miss Bernadette Saakwa -Vice Secretary
 Mr. Patrick Osei       –Organizer
 Mr. Anthony Boahene    -Financial Secretary

Bishops and priests 
The bishops and priests who worked at Pokuase include:

  Bishop Adolph Noser (SVD)
Bishop Joseph Oliver Bowers
Archbishop Dominic Kodwo Andoh
  Fr Adolphonse Merton (SVD)1972-1977
  Fr Gerald Fini (SVD) 1944 - 
  Fr Joseph H. Lauck(SVD) 1941- 
  Fr Otoo Henning (SVD)
  Fr Sila (SVD) 
  Fr Martin Wels (SVD)
  Fr Anthony Baiden Amissah 
  Fr Alex Bobby Benson 1984-1992
  Fr Albert Kretchmer (SVD)
  Fr Miguel Oppong 1992-1999
  Fr Lawrence Duho
  Fr Patrick Charkitey-Mensah 1999-2000
  Fr Matthias Kotoku Amuzu
  Fr Benjamin Poku Donkor (National Catholic Secretariat)
  Fr Edmund Ekow Neizer 2002-2004
  Fr George Ekow Mensah (1st Administrator )May 2006-Sept 2014
  Fr Albert Gyapanin( Asst to Administrator )2006
  Fr Peter Hesse (Asst Priest)2006-2010
  Fr Nicholas Dzikunu (Asst Priest)2010-now)
  Fr George Ekow Mensah installed parish priest 7 September 2014

Vocations 
In 2003, the church produced its first priest. Five other parishioners will soon become priests. The two priests from the church include: 
 Rev Fr. Ernest Dugah,  
 Rev Fr. Emmanuel Acheampong.

The parishioners who are in seminary to become priests include:
 Bro Ignatius Otusafo,  
 Bro Gabriel Obodai Torgbor 
 Bro Paul Sitso Amuzu.

Church choir 

A vibrant church choir supports the liturgy.  The choir masters are Cherubim Parku and Richard Dorhiame. The choir is supported by two organists, Richard Korsah and Samuel Saakwa. The first choir robe was dedicated in April, 2001. In 2013, the St. Sylvanus Church Choir took the first position in the choir competition held among the senior choirs for the 120th Anniversary Celebration.

Marriages 
The first mass wedding was celebrated in 1998 for ten couples. In 2008, another mass wedding was celebrated for thirteen couples. In  201, eight Marriage Councilors completed the Marriage and Family Life Course organized by the Archdiocese of Accra. A Marriage School was started on 3 June 2012. The school counsels couples who wish to bless their marriages.

The Marriage Counselors include:
 St. Sylvanus Church: Mr. Joseph Akado, Mr. Dominic Seshie, Mrs. Clementia Bienpuo
 St. Bakhita Church: Mr. Emmanuel Salu. Mr. William Dakpiri and Mrs. Margaret Adomolga
 Holy Trinity: Mr. Justus Kudu and Mrs Kudu

Outstations of St Sylvanus 

St. Sylvanus had seven outstations  including: 

 

In September 2012, St. Joseph the Worker, Medie, was made a Rectorate with St. Peter Adjen Kotoku and Papacy as outstations. Holy Family Church, Amamoley Oshuman Estate is attached to St. Sylvanus. Churches will soon be opened at ACP, Kwabenya and Domeabra near Katapor. There is a Catholic Charismatic Renewal Center at Kutunse for the spiritual formation of Catholics.

Catechists in rectorate 
Catechism is being taught in all the churches. This leads to baptism and confirmation of the members of the community. The catechists that handle catechism include:

Societies in the Church 

The societies in the church include:
 St. Anthony Society for Ewes, 
 St. Gabriel Society for Ga Adangbes, 
 St. Peter and Paul for Dagaabas, 
 Holy Family for the Akans. 
 Christian Mothers Association,
 St. Theresa of the Child Jesus, 
 Knights and Ladies of Marshall 
 Knights of St. John International and Ladies Auxiliary, 
 Parish Youth Council, 
 Catholic Organisation for Social and Religious Advancement (COSRA)
 Catholic Youth Organisation (CYO)
 Young Christian Workers 
 Knights and Ladies of the Altar (KNOLTA)
 Catholic Charismatic Renewal,
 Sacred Heart Confraternity,
 Legion of Mary

See also

References

Catholic Church in Ghana
Pokuase
Parishes of the Catholic Church